Gnathocera trivittata is a species of beetles belonging to the family Scarabaeidae.

Description

Distribution
This species is widespread in the afrotropical region (Togo, East Africa, Senegal, Ivory Coast, Ghana, Uganda).

Subspecies
 Gnathocera trivittata aegyptiaca Kraatz, 1886
 Gnathocera trivittata afzelii (Swartz, 1817)
 Gnathocera trivittata amitina Kolbe, 1914
 Gnathocera trivittata ardoini Ruter, 1967
 Gnathocera trivittata confinis Kolbe, 1897
 Gnathocera trivittata costata Ancey, 1883
 Gnathocera trivittata dorsodiscolor Voet, 1779
 Gnathocera trivittata moseri Schürhoff, 1939
 Gnathocera trivittata nyansana Kolbe, 1913
 Gnathocera trivittata perigrina Kolbe, 1897
 Gnathocera trivittata ruandana Kraatz, 1899
 Gnathocera trivittata trivittata Swederus, 1787
 Gnathocera trivittata uheha Kolbe, 1901
 Gnathocera trivittata wittei Allard, 1991

References
 Biolib
 Universal Biological Indexer
 Global Species

External links
 Flower-beetles

Cetoniinae
Beetles described in 1787